The Oslo School of Architecture and Design (AHO) is an autonomous institution within the Norwegian university system. The School offers a unique research-based education with a strong international standing within the fields of architecture, urbanism, design, and landscape architecture.

AHO offers three full-time master's programmes: Master of Architecture, Master of Design and Master of Landscape Architecture – the last programme is offered in Oslo and at the Arctic University in Tromsø. The school also offers post-professional Master's courses in Urbanism and Architectural Conservation. AHO offers a single type of doctoral degree, the Doctor of Philosophy.

History
The school was established directly after World War II as a "crisis course" for students of architecture who were unable to finish their degree due to the outbreak of the war. Before this, the only Norwegian option for obtaining an architectural degree was at Norwegian Institute of Technology (NTH) in Trondheim.

All through the first half of the twentieth century, a group of architects had worked hard towards the establishment of an architectural school that was more aesthetically and academically oriented than a polytechnic education. The school was ultimately situated in Oslo, since it was generally felt that the capital had access to many of the nation's best practicing architects.

Initially, the architectural course was part of the Norwegian National Academy of Craft and Art Industry. In 1961 The Oslo School of Architecture was established as an independent school, and, from 1968, located in St. Olavs gate.

In 1979, the first formal education in industrial design in Norway was offered as a two-year postgraduate study. A full degree program was established in 1983, and in 1989 this was placed under the direction of The Norwegian Arts and Crafts School. Then, in 1996, the Institute of Industrial Design became part of the Oslo School of Architecture.

Master of Landscape Architecture became part of AHO's master's programmes in 2004. In 2005, The Oslo School of Architecture changed name to The Oslo School of Architecture and Design. In 2009, the Institute of Industrial Design changed its name to the Institute of Design.

In 2001, the school moved to new facilities at Vulkan, a revitalised industrial area near the Aker River, a central, creative and cultural part of the city. The school lays adjacent to the Oslo National Academy of the Arts and the recently opened Food Hall. In 2005, the school updated its name to The Oslo School of Architecture and Design.

Units
Institute of Architecture
Institute of Design
Institute of Form, Theory and History
Institute of Urbanism and Landscape

Notable alumni
 Sverre Fehn, architect
 Guðmundur Jónsson, architect
 Thomas Thiis-Evensen, architect
 Christian Norberg-Schulz, architect
 Monika Hestad, industrial designer and researcher
 Eveliina Sarapää, architect and footballer
 Jan Olav Jensen and Børre Skodvin, architects
 Erling Dokk Holm, journalist
 Carl-Viggo Hølmebakk
 Hanna Geiran, Norway's 9th Director General of the Directorate for Cultural Heritage
 Logi Már Einarsson, Member of the Parliament of Iceland
 Lotte Sandberg, art historian and journalist
 Sverre Wyller, post-war artist

References

External links
The Oslo School of Architecture and Design (AHO)

 
Architecture schools
Education in Oslo
Universities and colleges in Norway
Culture in Oslo
Educational institutions established in 1961
1961 establishments in Norway